Persoonia isophylla is a plant in the family Proteaceae and is endemic to New South Wales. It is an erect or spreading shrub with soft, pine-like leaves and groups of cylindrical yellow flowers. It is similar to P. pinifolia but the flowers of that species have small leaves at their base, where the flowers of P. isophylla have full-sized leaves at their base. The two species sometimes grow together but hybrids between them are rare.

Description
The flowers are arranged in groups of between ten and seventy at the ends of the branches. There is a full-sized leaf at the base of the group which continues to grow after flowering. The central style is surrounded by four yellow anthers which are also joined at the base with the tips rolled back, so that it resembles a cross when viewed end-on. Flowering occurs from January to July and is followed by fruit which are smooth green drupes usually with reddish-purple blotches.

Taxonomy and naming
Persoonia isophylla was first formally described in 1991 by Peter H. Weston and Lawrie Johnson from a specimen collected at Peats Ridge. The description was published in Telopea. The specific epithet (isophylla) is derived from the Ancient Greek prefix isos meaning "equal" and phyllon meaning "leaf"referring to groups of flowers which have a full-sized leaf at their base.

Distribution and habitat

References

isophylla
Flora of New South Wales
Plants described in 1991